Danish orthography is the system and norms used for writing the Danish language, including spelling and punctuation.

Officially, the norms are set by the Danish language council through the publication of Retskrivningsordbogen.

Danish currently uses a 29-letter Latin-script alphabet, identical to the Norwegian alphabet, with an additional three letters: Æ, Ø and Å.

History
There were spelling reforms in 1872, 1889 (with some changes in 1892), and 1948. These spelling reforms were based in the decisions of the Nordic spelling conference of 1869, whose goal was to abolish spellings that are justified by neither phonetics nor etymology and to bring Danish and Swedish orthographies closer.

In some cases, spelling of loanwords was simplified, but in general the question of spelling loanwords was largely left undecided.

In 1889,  was abolished from native words and most loanwords: Oxe>Okse, Exempel>Eksempel. The letter  was deleted from the combinations gje, gjæ, gjø, kje, kjæ, kjø: Kjøkken>Køkken. Additionally, spelling of loanwords was standardized. In some cases, simplified spellings were adopted ( sounded  mostly becomes ;  in words of Greek origin are replaced by ), but in many cases original spellings were retained.

In 1948  was re-introduced or officially introduced in Danish, replacing . The letter then came from the Swedish alphabet, where it has been in official use since the 18th century. The initial proposal was to place  first in the Danish alphabet, before . Its place as the last letter of the alphabet, as in Norwegian, was decided in 1955. The former digraph  still occurs in personal names and in Danish geographical names. However, in geographical names,  is allowed as an alternative spelling: Aabenraa or Åbenrå, Aalborg or Ålborg, Aarhus or Århus.  remains in use as a transliteration, if the letter is not available for technical reasons.  is treated like  in alphabetical sorting, not like two adjacent , meaning that while  is the first letter of the alphabet,  is the last.

All nouns in Danish used to be capitalized, as in German. The reform of 1948 abolished the capitalization of all nouns.

Alphabet

 In monomorphematic words, vowels are usually short before two or more consonants + .
 Vowels are usually long before a single consonant + .
 In two consecutive vowels the stressed vowel is always long and the unstressed is always short.

The letters  are not used in the spelling of native words. Therefore, the phonemic interpretation of letters in loanwords depends on the donating language. However, Danish tends to preserve the original spelling of loanwords. Many words originally derived from Latin roots retain  in their Danish spelling, for example Norwegian  vs Danish . The verb , derived from the name of the letter  itself, can be spelled either way. The letter  is also used instead of eks- in abbreviations: , also written .

The "foreign" letters also sometimes appear in the spelling of otherwise-indigenous family names. For example, many of the Danish families that use the surname Skov (literally: "Woods") spell it Schou. Also  has been restored in some geographical names: Nexø, Gladsaxe, Faxe.

Also, the collating order for these three letters is different: Å, Ä, Ö.

The Danish version of the alphabet song still states that the alphabet has 28 letters; the last line reads , i.e. "that makes twenty-eight". However, today the letter  is considered an official letter.

Diacritics
Standard Danish orthography has no compulsory diacritics, but allows the use of an acute accent for disambiguation. Most often, an accent on  marks a stressed syllable in one of a pair of homographs that have different stresses, for example  (a boy) versus  (one boy).

Less often, any vowel except  may be accented to indicate stress on a word, either to clarify the meaning of the sentence, or to ease the reading otherwise. For example:  ("I was standing"), versus  ("I got out of bed");  ("the dog does (it)"), versus  ("the dog barks"). Most often, however, such distinctions are made using typographical emphasis (italics, underlining) or simply left to the reader to infer from the context, and the use of accents in such cases may appear dated.

Correspondence between sound and spelling 
The following tables lists graphemes used in Danish and their pronunciations.

Computing standards

In computing, several different coding standards have existed for this alphabet:

 DS 2089, later established in international standard ISO 646
 IBM PC code page 865
 ISO 8859-1
 Unicode

See also
 Comparison of Danish, Norwegian and Swedish#Writing_system
 Comparison of Danish, Norwegian and Swedish#Pronunciation and sound system
 Danish braille
 Danish phonology
 Icelandic orthography
 Futhark, the Germanic runes used formerly
 Spelling alphabets
 Swedish alphabet

References

External links

 Type Danish characters online
 1889 spelling reform (in Danish)
 1948 spelling reform (in Danish)
 Current orthographic rules (in Danish)

Orthography
Indo-European Latin-script orthographies